Robert E. Hopkins (September 21, 1886 – December 22, 1966) was a screenwriter. He was nominated for the Academy Award for Best Story for the 1936 film San Francisco.

Hopkins was born in Ottawa, Kansas, and died in Hollywood, California, aged 80.

Partial filmography
Old Clothes (1925)
The Better 'Ole (1926)
Señorita (1927)
The Law of the Range (1928)
Wickedness Preferred (1928)
The Smart Set (1928)
Spite Marriage (1929)
Chasing Rainbows (1930)
San Francisco (1936)

References

External links

1886 births
1966 deaths
American male screenwriters
People from Ottawa, Kansas
Screenwriters from Kansas
20th-century American male writers
20th-century American screenwriters